Gardendale is the name of two places in the United States:
Gardendale, Alabama
Gardendale, Texas
Gardendale, Michigan in Fort Gratiot Township